William L. Sullivan (November 1, 1921 – September 11, 2013) was an American lawyer and politician.

Born in Harrodsburg, Kentucky, Sullivan served in the United States Army during World War II. He received his bachelor's degree from Centre College and his law degree from University of Kentucky College of Law. He then practiced law. He served in the Kentucky State Senate in 1954-1958 and 1966-1982 and was acting Governor of Kentucky several times. He died in Henderson, Kentucky.

Notes

1921 births
2013 deaths
People from Harrodsburg, Kentucky
Centre College alumni
University of Kentucky College of Law alumni
Kentucky lawyers
Kentucky state senators
United States Army personnel of World War II
20th-century American lawyers